Rhionaeschna californica, the California darner, is a species of darner in the dragonfly family Aeshnidae. It is found in Central America and North America. And prefers habitats like lakes, ponds, marshes and stream pools with edge vegetation including many with alkaline water conditions  Larvae sustain themselves on a diet of aquatic insects,very small fish and tadpoles. The adult-stage will eat almost any soft-bodied flying insect. 

The IUCN conservation status of Rhionaeschna californica is "LC", least concern, with no immediate threat to the species' survival. The population is stable. The IUCN status was reviewed in 2017.

References

Further reading

External links

 

Aeshnidae
Articles created by Qbugbot
Insects described in 1895